Sir Eric Weston (8 December 1892 – 20 October 1976) was a British-Indian civil servant and judge. He was an Indian Civil Service officer. He was the first Chief Justice of the Punjab and Haryana High Court.

Biography 

He completed his B.A. from Cambridge University and went on to join the Indian Civil Service.

He is chiefly notable for being the very first Chief Justice of the Punjab and Haryana High Court.

He served as a justice of Bombay High Court from 1943 to 1950. From 1950 to 1952, he was the first Chief Justice of the Punjab High Court from 1950 to 1952, when he retired. He was knighted in 1954.

References

External links

 Official Biography
 Book Excerpt
 National Archives

20th-century Indian judges
Knights Bachelor
Judges of the Punjab and Haryana High Court
Alumni of St John's College, Cambridge
Indian Civil Service (British India) officers
Judges of the Bombay High Court
British expatriates in India
British expatriate judges